Jaroslav Findejs (born 25 September 1943) is a Czechoslovak footballer. He competed in the men's tournament at the 1968 Summer Olympics.

References

External links
 

1943 births
Living people
Czech footballers
Czechoslovak footballers
Olympic footballers of Czechoslovakia
Footballers at the 1968 Summer Olympics
Footballers from Prague
Association football midfielders
Bohemians 1905 players